Feyzabad-e Now (also Romanized as Feyẕābād-e Now; also known as Feyẕābād-e ‘Olyā) is a village in Tirjerd Rural District, in the Central District of Abarkuh County, Yazd Province, Iran. At the 2006 census, its population was 25, in 8 families.

References 

Populated places in Abarkuh County